Jatun Yuraq Q'asa (Quechua jatun big, yuraq white, q'asa mountain pass, "big, white mountain pass", also spelled Jatun Yuraj Khasa) is a mountain in the Bolivian Andes which reaches a height of approximately . It is located in the Cochabamba Department, Ayopaya Province, Morochata Municipality. It lies northwest of Liqiliqini.

References 

Mountains of Cochabamba Department